Jorge Pérez Salinas (born 24 April 1972 in Pamplona, Navarra) is a former butterfly and medley swimmer from Spain, who competed for his native country at two Summer Olympics: in 1992 (Barcelona, Spain) and 2000 (Sydney, Australia).

References
 Spanish Olympic Committee

1972 births
Living people
Spanish male butterfly swimmers
Spanish male medley swimmers
Olympic swimmers of Spain
Swimmers at the 1992 Summer Olympics
Swimmers at the 2000 Summer Olympics
Mediterranean Games silver medalists for Spain
Mediterranean Games medalists in swimming
Swimmers at the 1991 Mediterranean Games